This is a list of the 19 members of the European Parliament for Sweden in the 2004 to 2009 session.

List

Notes

Sweden
List
2004